Giuseppe Jappelli (14 May 1783 – 8 May 1852) was an Italian neoclassic architect and engineer who was born and died in Venice, which for much of his life was part of the Austrian Empire. He was the youngest of nine children born to Domenico Jappelli and cousin to Luigi Jappelli, a painter and interior decorator. He studied at the Clementine Academy in Bologna. In 1836–7, he traveled to France and England, an experience that would be formative on his career as a park architect. His best-known work is the Pedrocchi Café in Padua. Among his other projects are:

Buildings:
Slaughter-house in Padua (1819–1824), now the Institute of Art
The Loggia Amulea (1825)
The University city of Padua (1824)
The prison in Padua (1822)
The Pedrocchi Café in Padua (1831)
The Teatro Verdi in Padua (1847)
Parks:
Garden with thermal lakes of Castello Palazzo Reale Selvatico
Garden of Sommi in Torre de' Picenardi (1814)
Villa Vigodarzere in Saonara (1816)
Villa Torlonia in Rome (1838–1840)
Pedrocchino in Padua (1837–1842)
Treves de'Bonfili Park (1829 - 1835), the first park designed in Padua

References

External links

1783 births
1852 deaths
Engineers from Venice
19th-century Italian architects
Architects from Venice
Accademia di Belle Arti di Bologna alumni
Architects from the Austrian Empire